Friedrich Konrad Griepenkerl (10 December 1782 – 6 April 1849) was a German Germanist, pedagogue, musicologist and conductor.

Life 
From 1805 to 1808 he studied theology at the Georg-August-Universität Göttingen, where he also studied philosophy and pedagogy with Johann Friedrich Herbart and philology with Christian Gottlob Heyne. In addition he studied music theory, piano and organ with Johann Sebastian Bach's devotee Johann Nikolaus Forkel († 1818). In 1808, on Herbart's advice, he went to Hofwil in Switzerland, where he became a teacher of the German language and literature at the newly founded Philipp Emanuel von Fellenberg Institute. He also directed the musical life of this school and the community.

University lecturer in Braunschweig 
In 1816 he moved back to Braunschweig where he taught at the Katharineum. In 1828 he took up an additional teaching position at the Obergymnasium, where he taught German language and literature, mathematics and philosophy.

Musician and musicologist 
Griepenkerl founded a singing academy in Braunschweig, which under his direction performed Bach's chorals and his Mass in B minor. He was a co-organizer of the Braunschweig music festivals of 1836, 1839 and 1841. Griepenkerl was in friendly contact with important musicians of his time, such as Carl Friedrich Zelter, Carl Maria von Weber, Gaspare Spontini, Louis Spohr, Giacomo Meyerbeer and Felix Mendelssohn Bartholdy. Together with Ferdinand August Roitzsch (1805-1889), he published a critical edition of J. S. Bach's piano and organ works in the years from 1837. He wrote the text for a great opera Pino di Porto by the Braunschweig court kapellmeister Georg Müller which was unsuccessful, however

Griepenkerl died in Braunschweig at age 66.

Family 
The older son  (1810-1868) was a dramatist, storyteller and university lecturer at the Collegium Carolinum, the younger son Erich (1813-1888) President of the Brunswick Chamber. His son  was a physician in Königslutter and paleontologist.

Griepenker died in Braunschweig at age 66.

Work 
 Von den Formen der Deklinazion und Konjugazion ihrem Begriffe nach zur Begründung einer allgemeinen philosophischen Grammatik (1822)
 Lehrbuch der Ästhetik. Braunschweig (1826)
 Centifolie : ein Taschenbuch für das Jahr 1830 ; mit Kupfer u. Musik.
 Lehrbuch der Logik. (1828, new edition 1831)
 Briefe an einen jüngeren gelehrten Freund über Philosophie und besonders über Herbarts Lehren. Braunschweig (1832)
 Johann Sebastian Bach’s Compositionen für die Orgel. Critically corrected edition by Friedrich Conrad Griepenkerl and Ferdinand Roitzsch. Leipzig im Bureau de Musique von C. F. Peters, 10 vols. from 1837.

References

Cited sources 
 
 
 :  Griepenkerl, Friedrich Konrad. In Manfred Garzmann, Wolf-Dieter Schuegraf (ed.): . Supplementary volume. Joh. Heinr. Meyer Verlag, Braunschweig 1996, .
Historical references
 Allgemeine Literatur-Zeitung (1822)

External links 
 
 Andreas Waczkat: Friedrich Konrad Griepenkerl (1782–1849) (PDF)
 

Academic staff of the Technical University of Braunschweig
Germanists
19th-century German musicologists
German music publishers (people)
1782 births
1849 deaths
People from Peine (district)